4-Fluoromethamphetamine (4-FMA) is a stimulant drug related to methamphetamine and 4-fluoroamphetamine. It has been reported to be sold as a designer drug, but little is known about its pharmacology or toxicology. It was first detected from legal highs sold in Japan in 2006 and became illegal to sell or to possess for the purpose of distribution (although not to simply possess for personal use) in Japan in 2008. It was initially reported to be contained as an ingredient in some of the range of party pills sold internationally by the Israeli company Neorganics from around 2006 onwards, but this was later shown to be incorrect and this ingredient was eventually identified as the closely related compound 2-fluoromethamphetamine.

Pharmacology
4-FMA is a CYP450 inhibitor. It reduces the metabolism of methamphetamine, which has the effect of increasing its potency, duration and systemic toxicity while also reducing its cellular toxicity.

Legal status

Australia
4-FMA is considered a Schedule 9 substance in Australia under the Poisons Standard (October 2015). A Schedule 9 substance is a substance which may be abused or misused, the manufacture, possession, sale or use of which should be prohibited by law except when required for medical or scientific research, or for analytical, teaching or training purposes with approval of Commonwealth and/or State or Territory Health Authorities.

Canada 
As of 1996, 4-FMA is a controlled substance in Canada, due to being an analog of methamphetamine.

China
As of October 2015 4-FMA is a controlled substance in China.

United States
As a close analog of scheduled controlled substance, sale or possession of 4-FMA could be potentially be prosecuted under the Federal Analogue Act.

See also 

 2-Fluoromethamphetamine (2-FMA)
 3-Fluoromethamphetamine (3-FMA)
 3-Fluoroethamphetamine (3-FEA)
 4-Fluoroamphetamine (4-FA)
 4-Fluoromethcathinone (4-FMC)
 4-Methylmethamphetamine (4-MMA)
 4-Methoxymethamphetamine (PMMA)
 Fenisorex

References 

Designer drugs
Methamphetamines
Euphoriants
Serotonin-norepinephrine-dopamine releasing agents
Fluoroarenes
Entactogens and empathogens